Kerley Downs (meaning wolf's tumulus) is a moorland southeast of Chacewater in Cornwall, England.

References

Moorlands of Cornwall